Live in Rio  is a live album by American band Earth, Wind & Fire released in November 2002 on Kalimba Music.

Overview
The album was recorded during a 1980 performance in Rio de Janeiro, Brazil.

Critical reception

Billboard described Live in Rio as an "energetic set" and "a colourful, smile generating showcase". With a three out of five stars rating Alex Henderson of AllMusic called the LP "a valuable if imperfect addition to their catalog" that's "still something to celebrate." Steve Morse of the Boston Globe noted that "the band's boogie down energy still carries the night".

Track listing

Personnel

References

Earth, Wind & Fire live albums
2002 live albums
Albums produced by Maurice White
Kalimba Music albums